Megachile rufiplantis is a species of bee in the family Megachilidae. It was described by Vachal in 1904.

References

rufiplantis
Insects described in 1904